James Lister (born July 12, 1951 – 2010) was an American basketball player.

College career 
Lister played collegiate for Sam Houston State and was inducted to the team's Hall of Honour in 1981. He is the all-time leading scorer for the Bearkats with 2,304 points (21.9 per game), as well as the all-time leading rebounder with 1,682 boards (16.0 per game). Lister scored a school record 47 points against East Texas in 1971.

Professional career 
Lister was selected by the Cleveland Cavaliers in the third round of the 1973 NBA draft with the 41st overall pick.  From 1978 to 1980, Lister played in the Netherlands for Nashua Den Bosch, where he averaged 12.0 points over 83 games and was named the Most Valuable Player of the 1978–79 season.

He played for the CDCP Road Builders of the Philippine Basketball Association (PBA) in their 1981 season. He averaged 22.2 points in 7 played games.

Personal 
James was the brother of Alton Lister, who is also a former basketball player and current coach.

Lister died in Fort Worth, Texas 2010 at age 59.

References 

1951 births
2010 deaths
Le Mans Sarthe Basket players
American men's basketball players
Heroes Den Bosch players
Sam Houston Bearkats men's basketball players
American expatriate basketball people in the Netherlands
American expatriate basketball people in the Philippines
American expatriate basketball people in France
Philippine Basketball Association imports